Ti Oluwa Ni Ile (English: The Land is the Lord's) is a Nollywood Yoruba drama film sequel directed by Tunde Kelani. Released in 1993 through Mainframe Films and Television Productions, the film was Tunde Kelani's debut film as a film director. It was made in 3 parts and  listed as one of the 10 best selling Yoruba movies.

Plot 
Two greedy men engage the services of a corrupt chief sell a piece of an ancestral land for kickbacks. The new landowners are a petroleum company. The oracle; mouthpiece of the gods however reveal that the land belongs to the deities of the land and therefore not fit for a petrol station. The land sellers die suddenly and the chief realises he is next. He goes to the oracle for help. The oracle tells him that he will survive if he can prevent the body of the second co-conspirator from being buried. The story follows his futile attempts to prevent the eventual burial. The oracle gives him a second chance but he runs away and is faced by a series of unfortunate events. He eventually makes his way home and finds that he has been presumed dead. He attempts to reclaim his traditional title but the spirits of his co-conspirators come for his life.

Cast
Kareem Adepoju
Dele Odule
Lekan Oladapo
Yemi Shodimu
Yetunde Ogunsola
Oyin Adejobi
Gbolagbade Akinpelu
Jide Oyegunle
Akin Sofoluwe

References

External links
 

1994 films
Films directed by Tunde Kelani
Nigerian drama films
Yoruba-language films